DMCI Homes, Inc. is the real estate arm of DMCI Holdings through its wholly owned subsidiary DMCI Project Developers, Inc. (PDI).  It was incorporated and registered with the Securities and Exchange Commission (SEC) on April 27, 1995. It ranked #146 in the Business World Top 1000 Corporations for 2014.

History
From 1995 to 2008, DMCI Homes was headquartered in Dacon Plaza, 1728 Don Chino Roces Avenue Extension, Makati, sharing the office with DMCI and Semirara Mining Corporation . Total manpower started at around 75 employees and grew to 600 employees prompting the need to transfer to DMCI Homes Corporate Center in 1321 Apolinario St., Brgy. Bangkal, Makati (former Intel Building). As of 2012, DMCI Homes’ employees number at around 1,400.
 
DMCI Homes started its commercial operations in 1999 when it constructed its first Medium Rise Development, the Lake View Manors in Taguig.
 
In 2000, the first DMCI Homes hybrid development (Mid- and High-Rise Buildings in a property) is constructed (Hampstead Gardens Condominium). It introduced the Pin Wheel Architectural Design which optimized the flow of fresh air and ambient light into the building.

In 2004, the first themed Medium Rise Development, the Mayfield Park Residences in Rizal, was constructed. It featured Neo-Asian influences in the buildings’ architecture and landscaping.

In 2006, DMCI Homes ventured into leisure residences with the construction of Alta Vista de Boracay in Malay, Aklan.  Lumiventt Design Technology  is also introduced with the development of Tivoli Garden Residences, Mandaluyong in the same year.

In 2017, DMCI Homes became the Philippines' first real-estate firm to be recognized as a quadruple A contractor. The notice on DMCI Homes’ upgraded category was released last January 18 by Philippine Contractors Accreditation Board (PCAB), the implementing arm of the Construction Industry Authority of the Philippines (CIAP) under Department of Trade and Industry (DTI).

On the same year, DMCI Homes was also recognized at the Dot Property Philippines Awards 2017 as Best Developer in Davao City for its first development in Mindanao - Verdon Parc, and an Award of Distinction for its Corporate Website in the 23rd Communicator Awards.

Holding firm
DMCI Holdings, Inc. was incorporated on March 8, 1995, as a holding company to consolidate all construction businesses, construction component companies, and related interests of the Consunji Family. It was listed on the Philippine Stock Exchange on December 18, 1995.

Affiliates
General Construction
D.M. Consunji Inc., a wholly owned subsidiary that is engaged in general construction services – the company’s core business. The subsidiary was founded in 1954. In late 1992, it received an award from the Construction Industry Authority of the Philippines for outstanding constructor in the building category for the years 1986–1992.

Some of the landmark infrastructures that DMCI built include:
Solaire Resort & Casino (Entertainment City, Bay City, Paranaque City)
SM Megamall (Mandaluyong)
Mactan Shangri-La Hotel (Mactan, Lapu-Lapu City, Cebu)
Makati Shangri-la (Makati)
Shangri-la Resorts & Spa Boracay (Malay, Aklan)
Manila Hotel (Rizal Park, Manila)
Philippine International Convention Center (CCP Complex, Roxas Boulevard, Pasay)
The Westin Philippine Plaza/Sofitel (CCP Complex, Roxas Boulevard, Pasay)
Cultural Center of the Philippines Complex (Roxas Boulevard, Pasay)
Ayala Tower One (Makati)
The New Istana Palace (Sultan’s Palace, Brunei, Darussalam)
The Asian Hospital (Filinvest Corporate City, Muntinlupa)
The Manila Doctor’s Hospital (UN Avenue, Manila)
NAIA Expressway Phase 2
Metro Manila Skyway Stage 3 (Sections 1&2)
Line 2 East Extension (Masinag Extension)

Investment
Project Developers, Inc. (PDI) - another wholly owned subsidiary that is engaged in construction business-generating investments primarily through its significant minority interests in various project and infrastructure development activities. The surge in demand for urban homes inspired DMCI to construct its very own housing projects – DMCI Homes.

Mining
Semirara Mining Corporation (PSE: SCC), a 56%-owned subsidiary, is a publicly listed company engaged in the exploration, mining and development of coal resources on Semirara Island in Caluya, Antique. It is currently the Philippines’ largest coal-producing company with a guaranteed long-term market by virtue of its supply contract with the state-run National Power Corporation.
DMCI Mining Corporation (DMC)  is 100%-owned subsidiary engaged in ore and mineral mining and exploration. The mining operation is an open pit extraction of nickel, chromite, and iron laterite for direct shipping. It was incorporated on May 29, 2007.

Water
DMCI-MPIC Water Company, Inc. (DMWCI) - is 55-45 joint venture with Metro Pacific Investments Corporation (PSE: MPIC)  which has a 92% stake on Maynilad Water Services, Inc. (Maynilad) which operates at the West Zone of Metro Manila.  Presently, Maynilad has a total of 762,315 billed water services, equivalent to a population of around 6.2 million, in the West Zone which covers nine cities and two municipalities in Metro Manila and one city and five towns in the Cavite province.
Subic Water and Sewerage Company

The first privatized water company in the Philippines and Southeast Asia to be ISO certified is a joint venture with three (3) other companies consisting of Biwater, the British water utility specialist, Subic Bay Metropolitan Authority (SBMA), and Olongapo City Water District (OCWD).

Power
DMCI Power Corporation (DPC) – is a 100%-owned subsidiary engaged in the business of a generation company that designs, constructs, invest in, and operate power plants.
Sem-Calaca Power Corporation (Sem-Calaca) - is 100%-owned by Semirara.  It was incorporated on November 19, 2009, aimed primarily to acquire, expand, and maintain power generating plants, develop fuel for the generation of electricity, and sell electricity.

Infrastructure
Private Infra Development Corp. (PIDC) – On September 11, 2009, the company subscribed to 1,449,684 representing 32.22% equity interest in Private Infra Development Corporation for the Tarlac–Pangasinan–La Union Expressway (TPLEX) Project.  TPLEX is an 88-km two-lane toll road with a 35-year concession including a 5-year construction period.

Memberships
The DMCI is a member of the Philippine Green Building Council.

References

External links
DMCI Holdings, Inc. Website
DMCI Homes Website

Real estate companies of the Philippines
Companies based in Makati